¿Got Cock? is the sixth studio album by the Revolting Cocks released on April 13, 2010, through 13th Planet Records.

Track listing

Personnel

RevCo
Josh Bradford - lead vocals
Al Jourgensen - keyboards, programming, background vocals, production
Sin Quirin - guitars, bass, keyboards
Clayton Worbeck - programming, audio remix (11)

Additional personnel
Sammy D'Ambruoso - drum programming
Isa Martinez - background vocals
Mark Thwaite - guitar (2)

References

2010 albums
Revolting Cocks albums
Albums produced by Al Jourgensen